"I Wonder Why" is a song recorded by Swedish Eurodance band Sonic Dream Collective, released in 1995 as the fourth single from their debut album, Gravity (1995). It is the follow-up to their successful hit "Oh, Baby All" and peaked at number 39 in Sweden, with 4 weeks within the singles chart. Lead vocalist Linn Engström wrote the lyrics for the song. A music video was also produced to promote the single.

Critical reception
Pan-European magazine Music & Media wrote, "The trio has already proved itself quite capable of climbing the charts; this one should have no trouble either. The US
radio version is a little too bland, but EHR will love the mid-tempo reggae pop mix and its happy melodies."

Track listing
 12" single, Sweden
"I Wonder Why" (1200 Hard Club Mix) – 6:24
"I Wonder Why" (Happy 12" X-10-Ded-Mix) – 5:25
"I Wonder Why" (Clean Club Mix) – 5:31
"I Wonder Why" (US Album Extended Version) – 5:16

 CD single, Sweden
"I Wonder Why" (Radio Version) – 3:30
"I Wonder Why" (Optical II Mix) – 5:09

 CD maxi, Europe
"I Wonder Why" (U.S. Radio Version) – 3:04
"I Wonder Why" (Reggae Pop Mix) – 4:50
"I Wonder Why" (Happy 12" X-10-ded Mix) – 5:25
"I Wonder Why" (1200 Hard Club Mix) – 6:24

Charts

References

 

1995 singles
1995 songs
Sonic Dream Collective songs
Epic Records singles
English-language Swedish songs